John M. "Red" Connally was a Major League Baseball outfielder. In two career games, he had 0 hits in 7 at-bats.

Red was likely an amateur player from St. Louis, but little else is known.  His date of death has been wrongly associated with similarly-named John Connell, who served as umpire when Red made his brief appearances.

References

External links

1863 births
1896 deaths
St. Louis Maroons players
Major League Baseball outfielders
Macon (minor league baseball) players
Baseball players from New York (state)
19th-century baseball players